PWR may stand for:
 Parliament of the World's Religions
 Paul Weel Racing, an Australian V8 Supercar motor racing team
 Philippine Wrestling Revolution, Filipino indie pro-wrestling promotion
 Politechnika Wroclawska, Wroclaw University of Technology
 Pratt & Whitney Rocketdyne, an American company producing rocket engines
 Pressurized water reactor, a type of nuclear power reactor
 Preston and Wyre Joint Railway, a historic railway company in Lancashire, England
 Pro Wrestling Report
 PWR (esports), an e-sports organization